The R393 is a Regional Route in South Africa that connects Sterkspruit via the Lesotho border to the R58 near Elliot.

External links
 Routes Travel Info

References

Regional Routes in the Eastern Cape